Gmina Jarocin may refer to either of the following administrative districts in Poland:
Gmina Jarocin, Greater Poland Voivodeship
Gmina Jarocin, Subcarpathian Voivodeship

See also
 Jarocin (disambiguation)